The MS-DOS 5.0 project started in December 1989. MS-DOS 5.0 Codename is "Lifeboat" based on MS-DOS 4.00 Code. MS-DOS 5.00 is first version MS-DOS to use betas builds.

Several MS-DOS 5.00 betas were released before the final launch:

See also
 DOS API
 List of DOS commands
 Timeline of DOS operating systems

References

Beta software
Discontinued Microsoft operating systems
DOS variants